The Vancouver Community Gardens are a group of community gardens located around the Vancouver area. Vancouver citizens involved in Community Gardens pledge to support the farm (via money, land or labour) and in turn receive a portion of the goods produced for personal use. Vancouver has over 75 community gardens in city parks and school yards.

Process of becoming a Community Garden in Vancouver 

The process of becoming a community garden involves an expression of interest application to the City of Vancouver. In order to be considered a community garden, the garden must grow crops for personal use, there must be a community development program and must increase biological diversity and educate the local community about food production.

The city also supports the development of the community gardens by helping groups establish and run community gardens, help locate suitable land, make agreements to use the land, and develop environmental education programs.

Once approved, the community is allowed to operate the community garden according to the guidelines  set by the City of Vancouver, British Columbia.

Government 
Farms and food processing businesses can apply to receive financial funding and support (up to 85% of projects) from the British Columbia Ministry of Agriculture through its Growing Forward 2 Program.

Urban Beekeeping was included in the urban agriculture bylaw as acceptable in the year 2005., while this law changed to include backyard chickens in 2010. Based on these policies, the City of Vancouver is now working toward achieving a goal in which 25% of the city's landscape is garden/farm land for edible produce.

Benefits of Community Gardens 

Community Gardens have been shown to enhance nutrition and physical activity and promote the role of public health in improving the quality of life.
The gardens have also been associated with community building and reduced crime rates. These results vary by city, however there are some important key elements that are common among successful community gardens.
 Leadership and Staffing: The city should provide adequate staffing and resources for the community as requested. This is especially crucial in the initial stages where the land is being transformed into a garden
 Volunteers and Community Partners: The involvement of the community is vital for the garden to thrive. This usually comes in the form of diverse volunteers from residences, schools, or businesses. 
 Skill-Building Opportunities: Gardening workshops provide opportunities for residences to develop skills in leadership, community organizing, cultural competency, and program planning.

Products Produced by Vancouver Community Gardens 
The Climate of Vancouver is moderate and typically rainy; this allows for a large number of fruits and vegetables to be grown throughout the year. The following is a list of products available to various Community Gardens in Southwest British Columbia:

Vegetables

Fruit

Chickens and Eggs 
While, in 2010, it became legal for individuals and communities to raise backyard chickens in Vancouver, certain guidelines do need to be followed.

A maximum of 4 hens (no roosters), 4 months or older, is allowed per lot is allowed.
Ducks, turkey, fowl and livestock are not allowed.
Eggs, meat and manure cannot be used for commercial purposed (must only be consumed/used by group or individuals heading the garden).
Backyard slaughtering is not allowed. 
Hens must be registered with the city. Registration is free and can be done online.

Honey 
A number of Vancouver CSAs now involve or specifically focus on beekeeping and honey production. Organizations like Vancouver Honey Bees, Hives for Humanity and Strathcona Beekeepers focus specifically on supplying urban community gardens and community centres with the supplies needed to engage in Urban beekeeping.

List of Community Gardens  in Vancouver 
organized alphabetically

Gardens in City Parks

Gardens on City Land 
City land can include some community centres and personal properties (households/apartment complexes).

References

External links 
Community Supported Agriculture:
 http://vancouver.wikispot.org/Community_Supported_Agriculture
 Hives for Humanity: http://hivesforhumanity.com

Agriculture in British Columbia
Community gardening in Canada
Geography of Vancouver